Across Languages and Cultures is a biannual peer-reviewed academic journal published by Akadémiai Kiadó (Budapest, Hungary). It publishes original articles and book reviews on all subdisciplines of translation and interpreting studies. The editor-in-chief is Kinga Klaudy (Eötvös Loránd University). The journal was established in 1999.

Abstracting and indexing
The journal is abstracted and indexed in the Social Sciences Citation Index, the Arts and Humanities Citation Index, and Scopus. According to the Journal Citation Reports, the journal has a 2021 impact factor of 1.292, ranking it 98th out of 194 journals in the category "Linguistics".

References

External links

Biannual journals
English-language journals
Publications established in 1999
Translation journals
1999 establishments in Hungary
Akadémiai Kiadó academic journals